NADH dehydrogenase [ubiquinone] flavoprotein 3, mitochondrial is an enzyme that in humans is encoded by the NDUFV3 gene.

The protein encoded by this gene is one of at least forty-one subunits that make up the NADH-ubiquinone oxidoreductase complex. This complex is part of the mitochondrial respiratory chain and serves to catalyze the rotenone-sensitive oxidation of NADH and the reduction of ubiquinone. The encoded protein is one of three proteins found in the flavoprotein fraction of the complex. The specific function of the encoded protein is unknown. Two transcript variants encoding different isoforms have been found for this gene.

References

Further reading

Human proteins